is a Japanese footballer currently playing as a forward for FC Imabari.

Career statistics

Club
.

Notes

References

External links

1995 births
Living people
Japanese footballers
Association football forwards
National Institute of Fitness and Sports in Kanoya alumni
Japan Football League players
J3 League players
FC Imabari players
Kochi United SC players